This is a list of electoral results for the electoral district of Murchison-Eyre in Western Australian state elections.

Members for Murchison-Eyre

Election results

Elections in the 2000s

Elections in the 1980s

Elections in the 1970s

Elections in the 1960s 

 Two party preferred vote was estimated.

Elections in the 1950s 

 Two party preferred vote was estimated.

Elections in the 1940s

Elections in the 1930s

Elections in the 1920s 

 Preferences were not distributed.

Elections in the 1910s

Elections in the 1900s 

 Mitchell had held the seat unopposed in 1897.

Elections in the 1890s

References

Western Australian state electoral results by district